Anti Drugs Strikers FC is a Sierra Leonean professional football club based in Newton, Sierra Leone. They  play in the Sierra Leone National Premier League, the top football league in Sierra Leone.

The club was founded in 1993.

Stadium
Anti Drugs Strikers represents Newton, Sierra Leone, and play their home games at the 1000 capacity EBK Stadium.

References

External links
Soccerway
SportPortalOpera

EEL
1993 establishments in Sierra Leone
Association football clubs established in 1993